Vamos is a Salvadoran political party. It was registered to the Supreme Electoral Court (TSE) on 4 November 2017 by obtaining 57,382 signatures as stated by law and legalised on 11 November 2017. In addition to being described as a centrist party, it accepts people from the left and the right.

History
Vamos participated for the first time in the 2019 presidential election, with the party's membership electing Josué Alvarado as their presidential candidate and Roberto Rivera Ocampo for the vice-presidential candidate. They received 0.76% of the popular vote.

In the 2021 legislative election, the party received 1.01% of the popular vote. They won one seat from the constituency of the department of San Salvador, represented by deputy Claudia Ortiz.

Electoral history

Presidential elections

Legislative Assembly elections

Municipal elections

References

Political parties in El Salvador
Political parties established in 2017
2017 establishments in North America